S100 calcium-binding protein G (S100G) is a protein that in humans is encoded by the S100G gene.

This gene encodes calbindin D9K, a vitamin D-dependent calcium-binding protein. This cytosolic protein belongs to a family of calcium-binding proteins that includes calmodulin, parvalbumin, troponin C, and S100 protein. In the intestine, the protein is vitamin D-dependent and its expression correlates with calcium transport activity. The protein may increase Ca2+ absorption by buffering Ca2+ in the cytoplasm and increase ATP-dependent Ca2+ transport in duodenal basolateral membrane vesicles.

References

Further reading

S100 proteins